Saint Louis of Toulouse Crowning His Brother Robert of Anjou is a painting by Simone Martini, commissioned from him by Robert of Anjou during the artist's stay in Naples around 1317. It shows Robert being crowned by his elder brother Louis of Toulouse, who was made a saint in 1317. It is now in the National Museum of Capodimonte in Naples.

References

Bibliography
Pierluigi Leone de Castris, Simone Martini, Federico Motta Editore, Milano 2003.
Chiara Frugoni, Le storie di San Francesco. Guida agli affreschi della Basilica superiore di Assisi, Einaudi, 2010.
P. de Rynck, Simone Martini: «San Luis de Toulouse coronando a Roberto de Anjou, rey de Nápoles», pp. 12–13, Random House Mondadori (2005) 

1310s paintings
Paintings in the collection of the Museo di Capodimonte
Paintings by Simone Martini
Paintings of Louis of Toulouse